Albert Victor Young (August 8, 1899– November 10, 1956)  was an American composer, arranger, violinist and conductor.

Biography
Young is commonly said to have been born in Chicago on August 8, 1900, but according to Census data and his birth certificate, his birth year is 1899. His grave marker shows his birth year as 1901. He was born into a very musical Jewish family, his father being a tenor with Joseph Sheehan's touring opera company. After his mother died, his father abandoned the family. The young Victor, who had begun playing violin at the age of six, and was sent to Poland when he was ten to stay with his grandfather and study at Warsaw Imperial Conservatory (his teacher was Polish composer Roman Statkowski), achieving the Diploma of Merit. He studied the piano with Isidor Philipp of the Paris Conservatory. While still a teenager he embarked on a career as a concert violinist with the Warsaw Philharmonic under Juliusz Wertheim, assistant conductor in 1915–16.

When he graduated from the Warsaw Conservatory, World War I prevented him from returning to the US, so he remained in Poland (which was occupied by the Germans), earning his keep by playing with the Philharmonic and in a quartet and a quintet. He also gave lessons. His future wife, Rita Kinel, who met him in late 1918, used to smuggle food to him, for he had neither enough money to buy it nor time to eat it.

He returned to Chicago in 1920 to join the orchestra at Central Park Casino. He then went to Los Angeles to join his Polish fiancée, finding employment first as a fiddler in impresario Sid Grauman's Million Dollar Theatre Orchestra then going on to be appointed concert-master for Paramount-Publix Theatres. After turning to popular music, he worked for a while as violinist-arranger for Ted Fio Rito.

In 1930, Chicago bandleader and radio-star Isham Jones commissioned Young to write a ballad instrumental of Hoagy Carmichael's "Stardust", which had been played, up until then, as an up-tempo number. Young slowed it down and played the melody as a gorgeous romantic violin solo which inspired Mitchell Parish to write lyrics for what then became a much-performed love song. Bing Crosby recorded it at least three times: in 1931, 1939, and 1942.

In the mid-1930s, he moved to Hollywood where he concentrated on films, recordings of light music and providing backing for popular singers, including Bing Crosby. His composer credits include "When I Fall in Love", "Blue Star (The 'Medic' Theme)", "Moonlight Serenade (Summer Love)" from the motion picture The Star (1952), "Sweet Sue, Just You", "Can't We Talk It Over", "Street of Dreams", "Love Letters", "Around the World", "My Foolish Heart", "Golden Earrings", "Stella by Starlight", "Delilah", "Johnny Guitar" and "I Don't Stand a Ghost of a Chance with You".

Records
Young was signed to Brunswick in 1931 where his studio groups recorded scores of popular dance music, waltzes and semi-classics through 1934. His studio groups often contained some of the best jazz musicians in New York, including Bunny Berigan, Tommy Dorsey, Jimmy Dorsey, Joe Venuti, Arthur Schutt, Eddie Lang, and others.  He used first-rate vocalists, including Paul Small, Dick Robertson, Harlan Lattimore, Smith Ballew, Helen Rowland, Frank Munn, The Boswell Sisters, Lee Wiley and others. One of his most interesting recordings was the January 22, 1932, session containing songs written by Herman Hupfeld: "Goopy Geer (He Plays Piano And He Plays By Ear)" and "Down The Old Back Road", which Hupfeld sang and played piano on (his only two known vocals).

In late 1934, Young signed with Decca and continued recording in New York until mid-1936, when he relocated to Los Angeles.

Radio, film and television
On radio, he was the musical director of The Old Gold Don Ameche Show and Harvest of Stars. He was musical director for many of Bing Crosby's recordings for the American branch of Decca Records. For Decca, he also conducted the first album of songs from the 1939 film The Wizard of Oz, a sort of "pre-soundtrack" cover version rather than a true soundtrack album. The album featured Judy Garland and the Ken Darby Singers singing songs from the film in Young's own arrangements. Young often collaborated with Ken Darby and the Singers for radio programs starring the popular Met Opera baritone John Charles Thomsen. He also composed the music for several Decca spoken word albums.

He received 22 Academy Award nominations for his work in film, twice being nominated four times in a single year, but he did not win during his lifetime. He received his only Oscar posthumously for his score of Around the World in Eighty Days (1956).  Harold Adamson wrote the lyrics to Around the World in 80 Days with Michael Todd's blessing.  Adamson could not be nominated for the words were written two weeks before Oscar night and the votes were in. Yet theaters around the country played the lyrics at intermission.   Thus, Victor Young holds the record for most Oscar nominations before winning the first award. His other nominated scores include Anything Goes (1936), The Big Broadcast of 1937 (1936), Artists and Models (1937), The Gladiator (1938), Golden Boy (1939), For Whom the Bell Tolls (1943), The Uninvited (1944), Love Letters (1945), So Evil My Love (1948), The Emperor Waltz (1948), The Paleface (1948), Samson and Delilah (1949), A Connecticut Yankee in King Arthur's Court (1949), Our Very Own (1950), September Affair (1950), My Favorite Spy (1951), Payment on Demand (1951), The Quiet Man (1952), Scaramouche (1952), Something to Live For (1952), Shane (1953), The Country Girl (1954), A Man Alone (1955), The Conqueror (1956) and The Maverick Queen (1956).

He contributed two tone poems, "White" and "Black", to the 1956 album Frank Sinatra Conducts Tone Poems of Color.

His last scores were for the 1957 films Omar Khayyam, Run of the Arrow and China Gate, which were released after his death. The last was left unfinished at the time of his death and was finished by his long-time friend Max Steiner.

"The Call of the Faraway Hills", which Young had composed for the film Shane, was also used as the theme for the U.S. television series Shane. Young won a Primetime Emmy Award for his scoring of the TV special Light's Diamond Jubilee, which aired on all four American TV networks on October 24, 1954.

As an occasional bit player, Young can be glimpsed briefly in The Country Girl (1954) playing a recording studio leader conducting Bing Crosby while he tapes "The Search is Through (You've Got What It Takes).“

Death
Young died on November 10, 1956, in Palm Springs, California, after a cerebral haemorrhage at age 57. He is interred in the Beth Olam Mausoleum in Hollywood Forever Cemetery, Hollywood, California. Dr. Max Nussbaum, rabbi of Temple Israel, Hollywood, officiated. His family donated his artifacts and memorabilia (including his Oscar) to Brandeis University, where they are housed today.

Broadway
 Murder at the Vanities (1933) – musical – contributing composer
 Blackbirds of 1933 (1933) – revue – featured songwriter
 Arms and the Girl (1950) – musical – performer for the role of "Son of Liberty"
 Pardon Our French (1950) – revue – composer
 Seventh Heaven (1955) – musical – composer

Awards and nominations

Academy Awards

Golden Globes

Primetime Emmy Awards

References

External links

 Victor Young Collection of Television Music. UCLA. Performing Arts Special Collections, findaid.oac.cdlib.org.
 
 
 Victor Young's Web, victoryoung.czechian.net
 Victor Young Collection at Brandeis University
 Victor Young recordings at the Discography of American Historical Recordings
 Victor Young Biography Project

1899 births
1956 deaths
20th-century American composers
20th-century American male musicians
20th-century classical musicians
20th-century American violinists
American film score composers
American male film score composers
American male violinists
American musical theatre composers
Best Original Music Score Academy Award winners
Broadway composers and lyricists
Burials at Hollywood Forever Cemetery
Decca Records artists
Golden Globe Award-winning musicians
Jewish American film score composers
Jewish American songwriters
Pupils of Isidor Philipp
Songwriters from Illinois
Varèse Sarabande Records artists
20th-century American Jews
American male songwriters